The 1962 Santa Clara Broncos baseball team represented Santa Clara University in the 1962 NCAA University Division baseball season. The Broncos played their home games at Washington Field, on the campus of Santa Clara High School. The team was coached by John Cottrell in his 2nd season at Santa Clara.  The Broncos finished 39–8, winning the California Intercollegiate Baseball Association with a 12–4 record.

The Broncos reached the College World Series, finishing as runner up to the Michigan Wolverines after a 4–5 loss in the 15-inning championship game.

Roster

Schedule and results

Schedule Source:

Awards and honors 
Ernie Fazio
All Tournament Team
All-CIBA Team
First Team All-American

Ken Flanagan
All Tournament Team

Mickey McDermott
All Tournament Team
All-CIBA Team

Bob Garibaldi
All Tournament Team
All-CIBA Team

John Boccabella
All-CIBA Team

John Giovanola
All-CIBA Team

Tim Cullen
All-CIBA Team

References

Santa Clara
Santa Clara Broncos baseball seasons
Santa Clara Broncos baseball
College World Series seasons
Pac-12 Conference baseball champion seasons